Henry Crabb may refer to:

 Henry A. Crabb (died 1857), American soldier and politician in California
 Henry Walker Crabb (1828–1899), American wine cultivator
 Henry Crabb (judge), Justice of the Tennessee Supreme Court